United Nations Security Council resolution 1641, adopted unanimously on 30 November 2005, after recalling Resolution 1545 (2004) regarding the situation in Burundi, the Council extended the mandate of the United Nations Operation in Burundi until 15 January 2006.

While affirming the sovereignty and territorial integrity of Burundi, the text also noted continuing factors of instability in the country, which constituted a threat to peace and security in the region.

See also
 Burundi Civil War
 List of United Nations Security Council Resolutions 1601 to 1700 (2005–2006)

References

External links
 
Text of the Resolution at undocs.org

 1641
2005 in Burundi
 1641
November 2005 events